Blackwater Township is one of fourteen townships in Cooper County, Missouri, USA.  As of the 2000 census, its population was 406.

The township takes its name from Blackwater River.

Geography
According to the United States Census Bureau, Blackwater Township covers an area of 25.26 square miles (65.42 square kilometers); of this, 24.88 square miles (64.45 square kilometers, 98.52 percent) is land and 0.37 square miles (0.97 square kilometers, 1.48 percent) is water.

Cities, towns, villages
 Blackwater

Unincorporated towns
 Shackleford Crossing at 
(This list is based on USGS data and may include former settlements.)

Adjacent townships
 Arrow Rock Township, Saline County (north)
 Lamine Township (northeast)
 Pilot Grove Township (southeast)
 Clear Creek Township (south)
 Heath Creek Township, Pettis County (southwest)

Major highways
  Interstate 70
  U.S. Route 40

Lakes
 Embry Lake
 Horseshoe Lake
 Wilson Lake

School districts
 Pilot Grove C-4

Political districts
 Missouri's 6th congressional district
 State House District 117
 State Senate District 21

References
 United States Census Bureau 2008 TIGER/Line Shapefiles
 United States Board on Geographic Names (GNIS)
 United States National Atlas

External links
 US-Counties.com
 City-Data.com

Townships in Cooper County, Missouri
Townships in Missouri